Patricia Keyser Ticer ( Smith; January 6, 1935 – August 7, 2017), known as Patsy Ticer, was an American politician.

Ticer was born in Washington, D.C. She grew up in Alexandria, Virginia and graduated from George Washington High School. In 1955, Ticer received her bachelor's degree in political science from Sweet Briar College. Ticer served on the Alexandria City Council in the 1980s. She then served as Mayor of Alexandria from 1991 to 1996. Ticer served in the Senate of Virginia from 1996 to 2011 and was a Democrat. Ticer died in a hospital in Alexandria, Virginia from complications from a fall.

Biography 
Ticer married John "Jack" Ticer in 1956. They had four children. She was a real estate agent and  served on the boards of Alexandria Library, Athenaeum, the Humane Society, and the United Way. She served as vestry senior warden of St. Paul's Episcopal Church in 1978, 1979 and from 1981 to 1983.

Ticer was elected to the city council in 1982 and served as Vice-Mayor in her second council term. She was elected mayor in 1991, and was the city's first female mayor.

References

External links

Project Vote Smart - Senator Patricia S. 'Patsy' Ticer (VA) profile
Follow the Money - Patricia S (Patsy) Ticer
2005 2003 2001 1999 campaign contributions
Washington Post - Senate District 30 Race

1935 births
2017 deaths
Democratic Party Virginia state senators
Mayors of Alexandria, Virginia
Virginia city council members
Women mayors of places in Virginia
Women state legislators in Virginia
Episcopalians from Virginia
Politicians from Washington, D.C.
Sweet Briar College alumni
20th-century American politicians
20th-century American women politicians
21st-century American politicians
21st-century American women politicians
Accidental deaths from falls
Accidental deaths in Virginia
Women city councillors in Virginia
20th-century American Episcopalians